Oh! Those Bells is a 1962 United States comedic television series starring The Wiere Brothers about the misadventures of three brothers who work in a Hollywood theatrical supply shop. It aired from March 8 to May 31, 1962.

Cast

Herbert Wiere...Herbie Bell
Harry Wiere...Harry Bell
Sylvester Wiere...Sylvester "Sylvie" Bell
Henry Norell...Henry Slocum
Carol Byron...Kitty Mathews
Reta Shaw...Mrs. Stanfield

Synopsis

Herbie, Harry, and Sylvester "Sylvie" Bell are three gentle-natured brothers who are the last surviving members of a family with a long history of making theatrical props, costumes, and wigs. Having moved from Germany to California to start new lives, they work in a Hollywood theater supply shop called Cinema Rents, located on Ridgeway Drive, where their irascible and easily flustered boss is Henry Slocum. Although they mean well, they manage to turn even the simplest everyday tasks into slapstick disasters. Slocums secretary, Kitty Mathews, is sweet, understanding, and beautiful, and Sylvie has a crush on her. The Bells live together in a bungalow, where Mrs. Stanfield is their landlady.

Production

A loosely structured show, Oh! Those Bells attempted to bring slapstick humor to American television. At the time, The Wiere Brothers – German-Austrian-born Herbert, Harry, and Sylvester Wiere – were internationally known slapstick comedians. Each episode allowed the Wiere Brothers to perform their old vaudeville act, including their comical musical numbers.

Jules White, known for his short-subject comedies starring The Three Stooges, created the show. He and Sam White produced the pilot episode, known both as "Money Mixup" and "Movie Money." Ben Brady produced the rest of the episodes.

The shows episodes were filmed in 1960, and CBS originally planned to air them during the 1960–1961 season. However, CBS decided to pull the show from the 1960–1961 schedule and instead ran it as a spring replacement series for The New Bob Cummings Show in 1962.

Reception

In a review of the premiere episode of Oh! Those Bells published in the Daily Freeman of Kingston, New York, on March 9, 1962, Cynthia Lowry said that The New Bob Cummings Show had been a disappointment, but that its replacement, Oh! Those Bells, made The New Bob Cummings Show look like a "blue-white, glass-cutting gem of comedy." She wrote that "From the opening moment when the stuffed head of the moose caught one Wiere by the seat of the pants to the hilarious climax when the boss was accidentally hit on the head by a golf club, it was one long maladroit bore," adding that Oh! Those Bells "may achieve the distinction of the year′s worst [television series] and certainly the one with the loudest laugh track."

Broadcast history

The last episode of The New Bob Cummings Show aired on March 1, 1962, and Oh! Those Bells premiered on CBS as its replacement on March 8, 1962. It was cancelled after the broadcast of its thirteenth episode on May 31, 1962. It aired on Thursday at 7:30 p.m. throughout its run.

Episodes

Sources

References

External links

Oh! Those Bells opening credits on YouTube
  sitcomsonline.com Oh, Those Bells!

1962 American television series debuts
1962 American television series endings
1960s American sitcoms
Black-and-white American television shows
CBS original programming
English-language television shows
Television series set in shops
Television shows set in Los Angeles